"Friend of a Friend" is an acoustic song by Foo Fighters, featured on their 2005 album In Your Honor. The song is performed solely by Foo Fighters' guitarist/lead vocalist Dave Grohl.

An earlier version of this song was recorded in 1990, after Grohl had joined the band Nirvana.

Song history
"Friend of a Friend" was the first acoustic song Dave Grohl had ever written.

The song was written by Grohl in 1990 (and recorded in secret the same year), and it was about his first impressions of new Nirvana bandmates Kurt Cobain and Krist Novoselic. He first wrote it in Kurt's Olympia apartment when Grohl stumbled upon an acoustic guitar owned by Cobain (referring to the lyrics "It was his friend's guitar"). The recorded song was released in 1992 in a collection of songs (entitled Pocketwatch) under the pseudonym 'Late!'

On April 30, 1997, the song was recorded for a BBC Evening Session.  In 2005, Grohl revisited the song, recording it again for the acoustic disc of the Foo Fighters' In Your Honor. The song was also included on the band's live album Skin and Bones.

Reception

Uncut praises the song, calling it an "uncharacteristically spiked critique of slackerdom that bears an eerie Cobain influence".

Accolades

Recording and release history

Studio versions

Live versions

Notes

Foo Fighters songs
Songs written by Dave Grohl
1992 songs
Song recordings produced by Nick Raskulinecz